A Love Story (German: Eine Liebesgeschichte) is a 1954 West German historical romantic drama film directed by Rudolf Jugert and starring Hildegard Knef, O.W. Fischer and  Viktor de Kowa. It was shot at the Wandsbek Studios in Hamburg and on location in  Celle and Umgebung. The film's sets were designed by the art directors Erich Kettelhut and Johannes Ott. It was produced by Erich Pommer's independent company Intercontinental Film. It was part of the tradition of Prussian films, which had enjoyed great popularity in the Weimair and Nazi eras.

Synopsis
In Prussia in 1764, a hero of the Seven Years' War falls in love with an actress who had previously been a mistress to another officer. He wants to marry her, but both his family and his superiors do everything they can to thwart the relationship, considering her low status as inappropriate for him.

Cast
 Hildegard Knef as 	Lili Schallweiß, Schauspielerin
 O.W. Fischer as 	Jost v. Fredersdorff, Rittmeister
 Viktor de Kowa as 	Manfred v. Prittwitz, Major
 Karl Ludwig Diehl as Oberst Kessler, Regiments-Kommandeur
 Mathias Wieman as 	Fritz v. Fredersdorff, Gutsbesitzer
 Claus Biederstaedt as 	von Gagern, Regiments-Adjutant
 Maria Paudler as 	Henriette Kessler
 Helga Siemers as 	Marta Kessler, Tochter
 Alf Pankarter as Leutnant v. Mürwitz
 Reinhold Schünzel as Schlumberger, Schauspieldirektor

References

Bibliography
 Broadbent, Philip & Hake, Sabine. Berlin Divided City, 1945-1989. Berghahn Books, 2010.

External links

1954 films
1950s historical films
German historical films
1954 drama films
German drama films
West German films
Films directed by Rudolf Jugert
1950s German films
Prussian films
Films set in the 18th century
Films shot at Wandsbek Studios
1950s German-language films